Phtheochroa schreibersiana is a species of moth of the family Tortricidae. It is found from Europe (Sweden, Great Britain, the Netherlands, Belgium, France, Spain, Corsica, Sardinia, Italy, Germany, Switzerland, Austria, the Czech Republic, Slovakia, Slovenia, Poland, Romania, Estonia, Latvia) to the Near East, the Caucasus and southern Russia (Sarepta). The habitat consists of hedgerows, marshes, river-banks and other damp areas.

The wingspan is 12–14 mm. Adults have been recorded on wing from May to June, in one generation per year.

The larvae feed on Ulmus minor, Prunus padus and Populus species. They initially feed among spun leaves of their host plant, but later feed in young shoots or leaf stalks. The species overwinters in the larval stage.

References

Moths described in 1828
Phtheochroa